Karumbanoor is a village/hamlet in Alangulam Taluk in Tenkasi District of the Indian state of Tamil Nadu.It comes under Andipatti Panchayath. It is located 23 km East of District headquarters Tenkasi. It is 12 km from Keelapavoor and 750 km from the state capital, Chennai. The Karumbanoor Pin code is 627851 and postal head office is Alangulam.Karumbanoor is surrounded by Kadayam Taluk on the west, Keelapavoor Taluk on the North, Pappakudi Taluk on the South, Surandai Taluk on the North. Cities near to Karumbanoor are Alangulam, Surandai, Vikramasingapuram, Tenkasi, Shenkottai.

Education

Colleges 
 Einstein College of Engineering
 Sardar Raja College of Engineering
 St. Mariam Polytechnic College
 CSI Jeyaraj Annapackiam Arts & Science College
 Rani Anna Government College for Women
 Thiruvalluvar College
 Ambai Arts College
 Aladi Aruna College Of Nursing in Alangulam

Schools in Karumbanoor 
 Kamaraj Hindu Primary School
 T.D.T.A. Primary School

Schools nearest to Karumbanoor 
 SSV Hr Sec School in Mathapattinam
 Andipatti Govt School
 Pulangulam Government School

Transport 
Rail
Kila Kadaiyam Rail Way Station is the closest railway station. Tirunelveli Rail Way Station is the major nearby railway station. Pavoorchatram railway station.

Bus
The Kandhavel minibus services in the village.
Government bus 34E

References 

Cities and towns in Tirunelveli district